Edgaras Želionis (born June 4, 1989) is a professional Lithuanian basketball player for New Taipei CTBC DEA of the T1 League. He plays at the power forward and center positions.

Professional career 
On July 5, 2017, Želionis signed with Neptūnas Klaipėda of the Lithuanian Basketball League.

On January 10, 2020, he signed with ESSM Le Portel of the French LNB Pro A. 

On July 24, 2021, Želionis returned to Neptūnas Klaipėda.

On September 13, 2022, Želionis signed with New Taipei CTBC DEA of the T1 League.

References 

1989 births
Living people
Afyonkarahisar Belediyespor players
BC Juventus players
BC Khimik players
BC Neptūnas players
BC Prienai players
BK Liepājas Lauvas players
BK Ventspils players
Centers (basketball)
ESSM Le Portel players
Lithuanian expatriate basketball people in Turkey
Lithuanian expatriate sportspeople in Latvia
Lithuanian men's basketball players
Power forwards (basketball)
Basketball players from Kaunas
Al Ittihad Alexandria Club basketball players
New Taipei CTBC DEA players
T1 League imports
T1 League All-Stars